Matthew Boling (born June 20, 2000) is an American track and field athlete specializing in the sprints and long jump. He won four gold medals at the 2019 Pan American U20 Championships in the 100 m, 200 m, 4 × 100 m relay and 4 × 400 m relay, and helped set world under-20 records in both of the relay races for the United States. He also ran in the semi-final for the American  team at the 2018 World U20 Championships that went on to earn silver in the final.

Boling gained national attention during the Spring of 2019 for his accomplishments in high school track and field. In March, he leaped the farthest in the long jump for a high school athlete in ten years with a 26' 3.5" (8.01 m) mark at the Texas Relays, and then bested the high school all-conditions 100 m record, breaking the 10-second barrier with a wind-assisted 9.98 seconds run on April 27, 2019. Boling finished his high school track career in May at the Texas state championships by running a 44.74 second anchor in the  relay for the Strake Jesuit Crusaders, coming from behind to win in the fastest time for a high school team in the nation that year (3:10.56)

Early life
Matthew Boling was born to Mark and Monique Boling on June 20, 2000, with a twin brother, Michael. They grew up in Houston, Texas and attended River Oaks Baptist School, where Matthew began running track. The two then began attending Strake Jesuit College Preparatory. Initially, Matthew competed in the high jump, then began focusing on the long jump and the 400m. At the 2018 IAAF World U20 Championships, Boling ran the opening leg for the USA's  relay team, which went on to get the silver medal in the final. In November that year, he committed to the University of Georgia.

Breakthrough
Boling went viral in 2019 when he broke the 10-second barrier with a wind-aided 9.98 seconds on April 27, 2019, setting the high school all-conditions record in the 100m. He subsequently took on the nickname White Lightning, which was a reference to his race and to his speed. He also long jumped 26 ft, 3in (8.01m) at the Texas Relays, the furthest jump for a high school athlete in 10 years. He went viral once again in the  when he split 44.74 seconds on his anchor leg to bring Strake Jesuit a win from over 20m behind.

After winning the 100m and 200m at the USA U20 Championships, Boling turned the double at the 2019 Pan American U20 Athletics Championships in San José, Costa Rica. Both times (10.11 and 20.31, respectively) were personal bests, and his 100m time of 10.11 was also a championship record. He then ran the 4th and 2nd legs for the USA's  and  teams, respectively, both setting World U20 records. For his performances, Gatorade awarded Boling its National Boys Track & Field Player of the Year honors for 2018–19, and he was named the 2019 High School Boys Athlete Of The Year by Track & Field News.

Collegiate career

2020
Before his first season at Georgia was cut short by the COVID-19 pandemic, Boling attempted the 60m, 200m, Long Jump and the  indoors. At the SEC Indoor Championships, Boling finished second overall in the 200m with 20.71 seconds, losing to Terrance Laird of LSU from the first section.

2021
Returning to track, Boling again tried each event and chose to focus on the 200m for the indoor season. At the SEC Championships, he was disqualified in the final for stepping out of his lane on the final turn, and Laird took the title. However, because he ranked high enough by running 20.37 in his preliminary, he qualified for his first NCAA Indoor Championships, where he corrected his mistake and won the national title. He clocked a 20.19, the joint-sixth fastest time in history.

At the SEC Outdoor Championships, Laird won the 100m/200m double, while Boling finished 2nd and 3rd, respectively. His time of 20.06 seconds was a personal best in the 200m. Boling ran the anchor for Georgia's , with a slight lead but was caught by Laird and finished 2nd. At the NCAA Outdoor Championships at Hayward Field in Eugene, Oregon, Boling finished 6th and 5th in the 100m and 200m, respectively. Boling was considered a Freshman in 2021 by many, due to COVID-19 causing a short season his Freshman year.

Boling stayed in Eugene for the US Olympic Trials, where he finished 14th overall in the 100m semis and 9th overall in the 200m semis, bringing his first complete College season and first Olympic tryout to an end.

2022
SEC Outdoor Track & Field Championship 
Placed 4th at the 100m in a time of 10.13.
Won the 200m with the time of 20.01.

NCAA Division 1 Outdoor Track and Field Championship
Placed 6th at the 100m with a time of 10.18.
Placed 2nd at the 200m in a time of 20.13

Statistics
Information from World Athletics profile unless otherwise noted.

Personal records

International competitions

National championships

NCAA results from Track & Field Results Reporting System.

Notes

References

External links 

2000 births
Living people
Track and field athletes from Houston
American male long jumpers
American male sprinters
Strake Jesuit College Preparatory alumni
Georgia Bulldogs track and field athletes